Stephen F. Cooper (born 1948) is a businessman and the former CEO of the Warner Music Group.

Education

Cooper has a BA from Occidental College and an MBA from the Wharton School of Business.

Career

Cooper has held several important positions with various companies throughout his career. He was in charge of several venture businesses. He previously served as Vice-Chairman of Metro-Goldwyn-Mayer and was also CEO of Hawaiian Telcom.

Cooper Investment Partners 
Cooper has also been the Chairman and a Managing Director at private equity firm Cooper Investment Partners since its founding in 2010.

Warner Music Group

Cooper became CEO of Warner Music Group (WMG) in August 2011, replacing Edgar Bronfman Jr., who then became Chairman of the company upon Cooper's appointment. During his time leading the company, it has grown substantially. In 2021, Warner Music Group reporters its highest quarterly revenue since the company was spun out of Time Warner in 2004. 

He was succeeded by Robert Kyncl as CEO of WMG in early 2023.

Personal life

Cooper is a Gary, Indiana native and a father to two. In 2017, Cooper's total salary was reported to be $15,206,818.

References

External links
</ref>

1948 births
Living people
American music industry executives
Wharton School of the University of Pennsylvania alumni
Occidental College alumni